Marcello Amador (born 27 September 1980) is a Mexican former professional tennis player.

Amador, who was born in Lagos de Moreno, reached a career high singles ranking of 323 while competing on the professional tour. He won two singles and two doubles titles on the ITF Futures Circuit.

In 2001 and 2002 he represented the Mexico Davis Cup team, appearing in a total of three singles rubbers. He finished 0–3 from these matches, but did manage to take a set off former world number one Marcelo Ríos in Querétaro.

At the 2002 Central American and Caribbean Games in San Salvador, Amador won a gold medal in the team event as well as a singles bronze medal for Mexico.

See also
List of Mexico Davis Cup team representatives

References

External links
 
  (Marcelo is incorrect spelling)
  (Marcelo is incorrect spelling)

1980 births
Living people
Mexican male tennis players
Sportspeople from San Luis Potosí
Central American and Caribbean Games medalists in tennis
Central American and Caribbean Games gold medalists for Mexico
Central American and Caribbean Games bronze medalists for Mexico
Competitors at the 2002 Central American and Caribbean Games
21st-century Mexican people